Jasmalnathji Mahadev Temple is an ancient temple located at Asoda village in Vijapur Taluka, Mehsana district, Gujarat, India. It is locally known as Vaijnath Mahadev temple. The temple is dedicated to Shiva. The temple is Monument of National Importance protected and maintained by Archeological Survey of India.

The temple is believed to have been built in the 10th century. It consists of a sanctum; mandapa and torana, a porch.

References

Shiva temples in Gujarat
Hindu temples in Gujarat
Mehsana district
Monuments of National Importance in Gujarat
Tourist attractions in Mehsana district